SM UC-99 was a German Type UC III minelaying submarine or U-boat in the German Imperial Navy during World War I.

Design
A German Type UC III submarine, UC-99 had a displacement of  when at the surface and  while submerged. The submarine was powered by two six-cylinder four-stroke diesel engines each producing  (a total of ), two electric motors producing , and two propeller shafts.

UC-99 was fitted with six  mine tubes, fourteen UC 200 mines, three  torpedo tubes (one on the stern and two on the bow), seven torpedoes, and one  SK L/45 or  Uk L/30 deck gun . Her complement was twenty-six crew members.

Construction and career
The U-boat was ordered on 12 January 1916 and was launched on 17 March 1918. She was commissioned into the German Imperial Navy on 20 September 1918 as SM UC-99. As with the rest of the completed UC III boats, UC-99 conducted no war patrols and sank no ships. She was surrendered to Japan on 22 November 1918. The U-boat was renamed O-5 for Japanese service from 1920 to 1921. O-5 was dismantled at the Yokosuka Navy Yard between March and June 1921. The hulk of O-5 was disposed of as a gunnery and torpedo target in October that same year.

References

Notes

Citations

Bibliography

 
 

German Type UC III submarines
Ships built in Hamburg
1918 ships
U-boats commissioned in 1918
World War I submarines of Germany
German Type UC III submarines of the Imperial Japanese Navy
World War I minelayers of Germany